Howison is a surname of Scottish origin which means "the son of Hugh." Notable people with the surname include:

 Alexander Howison Murray Jr. (1903-1997), mayor of Placerville, California
 Del Howison (born 1953), American horror author
 George Holmes Howison (1834–1916), American philosopher
 Henry L. Howison (1837–1914), American naval officer
 John Howison (c.1530–1618), Scottish minister
 Ryan Howison (born 1966), American golfer

See also
 Howson
 Howie

References

Surnames
Surnames of Scottish origin
Surnames of British Isles origin
Patronymic surnames